Okoboji Township is one of twelve townships in Dickinson County, Iowa, USA.  As of the 2000 census, its population was 2,087.

History
Okoboji Township was formed in 1859.

Geography
According to the United States Census Bureau, Okoboji Township covers an area of 36.12 square miles (93.54 square kilometers); of this, 36.09 square miles (93.48 square kilometers, 99.94 percent) is land and 0.03 square miles (0.07 square kilometers, 0.07 percent) is water.

Cities, towns, villages
 Milford (partial)

Adjacent townships
 Lakeville Township (north)
 Center Grove Township (northeast)
 Milford Township (east)
 Meadow Township, Clay County (southeast)
 Summit Township, Clay County (south)
 Waterford Township, Clay County (southwest)
 Westport Township (west)
 Excelsior Township (northwest)

Cemeteries
The township contains these two cemeteries: Little Sioux Lutheran and Saint Joseph.

Major highways
  U.S. Route 71
  Iowa Highway 86

Airports and landing strips
 Fuller Airport

Rivers
 Little Sioux River

Landmarks
 Horseshoe Bend County Rec Area

School districts
 Okoboji Community School District

Political districts
 Iowa's 5th congressional district
 State House District 06
 State Senate District 03

References
 United States Census Bureau 2007 TIGER/Line Shapefiles
 United States Board on Geographic Names (GNIS)
 United States National Atlas

External links

 
US-Counties.com
City-Data.com

Townships in Dickinson County, Iowa
Townships in Iowa
1859 establishments in Iowa
Populated places established in 1859